Events from the year 1827 in Denmark.

Incumbents
 Monarch – Frederick VI
 Prime minister – Otto Joachim

Events

 1 January – Johan Ludvig Heiberg (poet) publishes the literary journal  for the first time.
 May – Giuseppe Siboni opens the first music conservatory in Copenhagen.
 12 June – The Tightrope walker Christian Rost is killed during a show at Rosenborg drill grounds when his rope breaks.

Undated
 The crown acquires the Holstein Mansion in Copenhagen as a permanent home for the Natural History Museum.

Births
 8 February – Hans Schjellerup, astronomer (died 1887)
 1 March – Eiler Rasmussen Eilersen, painter (died 1912)
 16 March – Ferdinand Meldahl, architect (died 1908)
 20 March – Johannes Forchhammer, philologist (died 1909)
 12 May – Israel B. Melchior, photographer (died 1893)
 2 June – Petrine Fredstrup, ballet dancer (died 1881) 
 7 October – Christian Frederik Lütken, zoologist ad naturalist (died 1901)
 22 December – Anders Petersen (historian), historian (died 1914)
 - Natalie Zahle, reform pedagogue and pioneer on women's education (died 1913)

Deaths
 7 February  Peter Norden Sølling, naval officer (born 1758)
 September 3 – Adam Ditlev Wedell-Wedellsborg,  government official (born 1782)
 September 19 – Morten Thrane Brünnich, zoologist and mineralogist (born 1737)
 October 11 – Christian Ditlev Frederik Reventlow, statesman and reformer (born 1748)
 Marie Barch, first native Danish ballerina (born 1744)

References

 
1820s in Denmark
Denmark
Years of the 19th century in Denmark